Birds of a Feather is a 1958 album by Carmen McRae. The album was arranged by Ralph Burns, and features the saxophonist Ben Webster. All the songs on the album reference birds in some way.

Reception

John Bush reviewed the album for Allmusic and wrote that "Fortunately, there are plenty of good songs on the subject, and it's not so narrow that all the focus hinges on birds themselves." Bush praised Ben Webster's solo on "Bob White (Watcha Gonna Swing Tonight?)".
Webster's biographer, Frank Buchmann-Moller, wrote that his performances on the album alternate between "routine and inspired", and likened his work on "Flamingo" to the "beating wings of a landing bird".

Track listing 
 "Skylark" (Hoagy Carmichael, Johnny Mercer)
 "Bob White (Watcha Gonna Swing Tonight?)" (Bernie Hanighen, Johnny Mercer)
 "A Nightingale Sang in Berkeley Square" (Eric Maschwitz, Manning Sherwin)
 "Mister Meadowlark" (Walter Donaldson, Johnny Mercer)
 "Bye Bye Blackbird" (Ray Henderson, Mort Dixon, Gene Austin)
 "Flamingo" (Ted Grouya, Edmund Anderson)
 "Eagle and Me" (Harold Arlen, E.Y. Harburg)
 "Baltimore Oriole", (Hoagy Carmichael, Paul Francis Webster)
 "When the Red, Red Robin Comes Bob, Bob, Bobbin' Along" (Harry Woods)
 "Chicken Today and Feathers Tomorrow" (Johnny Marks)
 "When the Swallows Come Back to Capistrano" (Leon René)
 "His Eye Is on the Sparrow" (Civilla D. Martin, Charles H. Gabriel)

Personnel 
Carmen McRae - vocals
Ralph Burns - arranger, conductor
Ben Webster as "a tenorman" - tenor saxophone 
Al Cohn - tenor saxophone (2, 7-10, 12)
Marky Markowitz - trumpet
Dick Berg, Donald Corrado, Fred Klein and Tony Miranda - French horn (1, 3-6, 11)
Don Abney - piano
Mundell Lowe or Barry Galbraith (2, 8, 12) - guitar
Aaron Bell - double bass
Ted Sommer, Don Lamond (2, 8, 10) or Nick Stabulas (7, 9, 12) - drums
Ray Charles - choral arrangements (12)

References 

1958 albums
Albums arranged by Ralph Burns
Decca Records albums
Carmen McRae albums
Concept albums
Birds in art